SJVN, formerly known as Satluj Jal Vidyut Nigam, is an Indian public sector undertaking involved in hydroelectric power generation and transmission. It was incorporated in 1988 as  Nathpa Jhakri Power Corporation, a joint venture between the Government of India and the Government of Himachal Pradesh. The company has a total operating hydropower capacity of 1912 MW through its two hydropower plants—Nathpa Jhakri and Rampur. In addition, it has an installed capacity of 97.6 MW of wind power and 81.9 MW of solar power.

Apart from India, SJVN also has under-construction hydroelectric projects in Nepal and Bhutan.

See also
 NHPC Limited
 Hydroelectric power in Himachal Pradesh

References

Electric-generation companies of India
Hydroelectricity in India
Energy in Himachal Pradesh
Indian companies established in 1988
Companies based in Himachal Pradesh
Energy companies established in 1988